The Monkey Business Tour was the second concert tour by American hip hop group The Black Eyed Peas, in support of their fourth studio album Monkey Business (2005). The concert on October 3, 2005 at the Sydney SuperDome was filmed for the official DVD release Live from Sydney to Vegas.

Tour dates

Notes

References

2005 concert tours
2006 concert tours
Black Eyed Peas concert tours